American singer Miranda Cosgrove has released one studio album, two extended plays, four singles, and eight promotional singles. Cosgrove's debut as a recording artist began with the iCarly theme song "Leave It All to Me". The song features Drake Bell was released as a single in 2007 and peaked at number 100 on the Billboard Hot 100.

In June 2008, Columbia Records released the iCarly soundtrack, which featured four songs performed by Cosgrove. In December 2008, a cover of the holiday song "Christmas Wrapping" was released to promote the hour-long special Merry Christmas, Drake & Josh. On February 3, 2009, Cosgrove released her first solo recording, the extended play About You Now, exclusively on the iTunes Store. The song of the same title, "About You Now" reached number 47 on the Hot 100 in January 2009, becoming her most successful song to date. To promote the 2009 animated film Cloudy with a Chance of Meatballs, Columbia Records released a promotional single entitled "Raining Sunshine".

Cosgrove released her first studio album, Sparks Fly on April 27, 2010 and peaked at number eight on the US Billboard 200 chart. The album sold 36,000 copies in its first week. The first single from her album, "Kissin U", was released on March 22, 2010, and peaked number 54. In January 2011, Cosgrove revealed that her second EP would be titled High Maintenance, which was eventually released two months later. Its lead single, titled "Dancing Crazy", was written by Avril Lavigne and peaked at number 36 on the US Billboard Mainstream Top 40 chart and 100 on the Hot 100.

Studio albums

Extended plays

Singles

Promotional singles

Other appearances

Music videos

See also
List of awards and nominations received by Miranda Cosgrove

Notes

References

Pop music discographies
Discographies of American artists
Discography